Sensory, Inc. is an American company which develops software AI technologies for speech, sound and vision. It is based in Santa Clara, California.

Sensory's technologies have shipped in billions of products including mobile phones, automotive, Bluetooth devices, toys, and various home electronics. To date, more than 40 mobile handsets, tablets, and wearables have shipped with Sensory's TrulyHandsfree.

History
Sensory, Inc. was founded in 1994, originally as Sensory Circuits, by Forrest Mozer, Mike Mozer and Todd Mozer. The three had also co-founded ESS Technology years earlier. In 1999 Sensory acquired Fluent Speech Technologies, which was formed and started by a group of professors out of the Oregon Graduate Institute (formerly OGI, now OHSU). Fluent Speech Technologies developed high performance embedded speech engines, the technology from this acquisition is now the core technology used throughout Sensory's chip and software line.

Company timeline
 1994 – Founded 
 1995 – Introduces the RSC 164 - first commercially successful speech recognition IC
 1998 – Introduces first speaker verification IC
 2000 – Acquires Oregon based Fluent-Speech Technologies
 2002 – Acquires Texas Instruments line of speech output ICs (the SC series)
 2007 – Introduces first Voice User Interface for Bluetooth silicon (CSR BC-5) - BlueGenie
2008 - Sensory and BlueAnt partner on the V1 - Revolutionary new Bluetooth headset with a voice user interface. First wearable to use a voice user interface for control and best-reviewed speech recognition product in history
 2009 – Introduced world's smallest text to speech system (TTS) and Truly HandsfreeTM Triggers/ wake words.
 2010 – Introduced the NLP-5x – First Natural Language Voice Processor and TrulyHandsfree wake words in SDKs for Android, iOS, Linux, and Windows. NLP5x used the first generation of TrulyHandsfree wake words with low power and enhanced accuracy.
 2011 – Sensory partners with Google and Microsoft to enable TrulyHandsfree as a front end to Goog411 and Bing411
 2012 – Partnered with Tensilica to offer ultra-low power TrulyHandsfree wake words; introduced Speaker Verification and Speaker Identification for mobile phones and other consumer electronics.
2012 - TrulyHandsfree released into Samsung's Galaxy S2 for "Hey Galaxy" wake word
2013 – TrulyHandsfree wake words migrated to many new platforms and began shipping as MotoVoice in the Google-owned MotoX. Sensory's TrulyHandsfree in mobile takes off with the Galaxy S3 and S4 and Galaxy Note and is licensed into wearables like Google Glass.
2014 – Announced new initiative in Vision; added LG and Motorola as customers; received the 2014 Global Mobile Award for Best Mobile Technology Breakthrough at the GSMA Mobile World Congress in Barcelona, Spain (judges commented, "A big advance for the wearables market, this offers many benefits for consumers, increasing uptake and usage of many mobile apps, driving revenue for operators and content providers.")
2015-2018 - Licensed Google, Amazon, MSFT, Baidu, Huawei, ZTE, and many others with TrulyHandsfree wake words. Sensory develops first wake words for OK Google, Hey Siri, and Hey Cortana.
2019 - Sensory launched two new solutions: SoundID, sound identification, and TrulyNatural, embedded large vocabulary speech recognition. Sensory also acquired Vocalize.ai, an independent testing lab.
2020 - Sensory introduced VoiceHub, which allows the automated generation of wake words.
2021 - Sensory expands VoiceHub with speech recognition and NLU capabilities. The company initiated a new cloud platform, SensoryCloud.ai.

Technology and products
Sensory originally developed both hardware (Integrated Circuit - IC or "chip") and software platforms but migrated to software only around 2005 and added cloud and hybrid computing capabilities in 2021. Sensory's RSC-164 IC (Integrated Circuit or "chip") was used on NASA's Mars Polar Lander in the Mars Microphone on the Lander.  Speech Synthesis SC-6x chips – acquired some speech synthesis technology from Texas Instruments.

Sensory’s embedded AI solutions include the following:

 TrulyHandsfree (THF) - wake word detection and phrase spotting.
 TrulyNatural (TNL) - large vocabulary continuous speech recognition with NLU.
 TrulySecure (TS) - face and voice biometrics.
 TrulySecureSpeakerVerification (TSSV) - speaker and sound identification.
 VoiceHub - Online portal for creating custom wake words and speech recognition models with NLU.

The cloud initiative, SensoryCloud.ai, is targeting Speech To Text (STT), Text To Speech (TTS), Wake Word verification, face and voice recognition, and sound identification.

References

Speech recognition
Speech synthesis
Companies based in Santa Clara County, California
Technology companies based in the San Francisco Bay Area